Cricket 97 is a cricket game for PCs that was released in 1997. It was released in January 1997 in Australia and April 1997 in the United Kingdom. It was released throughout the rest of Europe on May 9, 1997.

Gameplay
The game stars cricketer Michael Atherton. Ritchie Benaud and Ian Botham provided commentary for the game.

Tour Edition
A Tour Edition of the game was released in late 1997. It featured actual photographs, real player names, portraits, and statistics of all major Australian and international cricketing personalities.

Reception

Richard Moore for The Age called the game "very realistic" but criticized the "play-balance-driven parity of the sides".

George Soropos for PC PowerPlay rated Cricket 97 Ashes Tour Edition at 87% and stated that "Really, this is the game that Cricket '97 should have been in the first place and all credit to Beam for sticking with it until they got it right."

The game shipped 50,000 units. It was the No. 1 best-selling sports title in Australia and the No. 3 best-selling title in Australia overall when it was released. In the UK, the game entered the Top Ten UK Charts straight into 8th position for PC CD-ROM games.

Reviews
Power Unlimited (Sep, 1997)

References

External links

1997 video games
Cricket video games
DOS games
EA Sports games
Europe-exclusive video games
Multiplayer and single-player video games
Video games developed in Australia
Video games set in Australia
Windows games